True Colors: The Best of Cyndi Lauper is a 2009 compilation album by Cyndi Lauper, released exclusively in Australia, New Zealand and the European Union as part of Sony Camden, a budget range of compilations by Sony Music.

The set features two discs, both with 18 songs, spanning from the start of Lauper's career (1983's She's So Unusual) through to 1996's Sisters of Avalon. All studio albums through the period are represented, and placed alongside most of the singles from this time are several album tracks. The songs are not placed in chronological order. All of the tracks from A Night to Remember (except "Intro", "A Night to Remember" and "Insecurious") appear on the set.  In fact (excluding the latter two of the absent songs), tracks 6 through 13 on the second disc of this compilation are an exact replication of the track order on A Night to Remember. The cover of the album was first used as the cover for her cover of Marvin Gaye's "What's Going On".

Sony Camden also released another Cyndi Lauper compilation in Australia in 2009; the single-disc Time After Time: The Best of Cyndi Lauper, variants of which have been released (earlier) worldwide.

Track listing

Certifications and sales

References

Cyndi Lauper compilation albums
2009 compilation albums